Cumming Group is a privately held international project management and cost consulting firm with a focus on serving the education, healthcare, themed entertainment, and hospitality sectors.  In 2017, the international construction consultancy generated an estimated $117 million in professional fees on more than $4 billion in construction.

History 

In 1996, Finlay Cumming established Cumming LLC in Southern California. Between 2002 and 2006, Cumming opened new offices in Northern California, Colorado, Nevada, Florida, Arizona, Texas, and Georgia. Later in 2006, Cumming was named to Engineering News-Record’s listing of the Top 100 CM-for-Fee firm in the United States, and continues to receive the honor, ranking in the top 40 every year since.

In 2007, the firm officially incorporated as Cumming Corporation and a year later in 2008, Cumming acquired Construction Controls Group (CCG), a Los Angeles-based program and project/construction management business. Shortly after the acquisition of CCG, Cumming acquired Southern Management Group (SMG), a South Carolina-based firm with more than 20 years of experience in program and project/construction management. Later in 2008, after several years working abroad, Cumming established Cumming International and opened its first overseas office in Abu Dhabi.

Present 
As of 2020, Cumming Group had more than 30 offices internationally with more than 950 employees. According to Engineering News-Record (ENR), Cumming Group continues to rank among the top 20 construction management firms on its annual listing of the Top 100 CM-for-Fee Firms in the United States.

References 

Construction and civil engineering companies of the United States
Consulting firms of the United States